Suncoast Credit Union is a credit union headquartered in Tampa, Florida. The credit union formed in 1934 to originally serve teachers in Hillsborough County and later expanded to serve school employees within the state's suncoast region. Since December 2013, the credit union is open to anyone who lives, works, attends school, or worships in the 39 counties which the credit union serves. As of June 2022, Suncoast has $14.96 billion in assets and more than 1 million members.

History
The credit union began as Hillsborough County Teachers Credit Union on January 31, 1934, with the intention to help teachers working in Hillsborough County. The credit union amended its charter in 1953 to open membership to teachers in the nearby Citrus, DeSoto, Hardee, Hernando, and Pasco counties. By 1960, membership was opened to Charlotte, Levy, Manatee, and Sumter counties as well as to all employees of schools in counties their charter extended to. To reflect its changed field of membership, the credit union changed its name to Suncoast Schools Credit Union in 1975. In 1978, it converted to a federal charter and changed its name again to Suncoast Schools Federal Credit Union. In December 2013, the credit union obtained a state charter and changed its name to Suncoast Credit Union.

In December 2019, the credit union was in the process of purchasing Apollo Bank which was expected to be completed by May 2020. However, the purchase was withdrawn as a result of the COVID-19 pandemic. The purchase would have been Florida's largest-ever bank acquisition by a credit union.

Suncoast Credit Union reached one million members in December 2021, becoming the 10th credit union to reach one million members.

In its commitment to sustainability, Suncoast has built three administration buildings and 16 branch locations powered by solar energy. Five of those branches are net zero, producing enough energy to fully offset their use. Their “eco-friendly” branches feature LED lighting throughout, high-efficiency windows and insulation, geothermal air conditioning and heating, and 40-kilowatt solar power panels to offset electricity. They average 80% more energy efficiency than a standard branch.

References

Credit unions based in Florida
Banks established in 1934
Companies based in Tampa, Florida
1934 establishments in Florida